Mayana is a genus of true bugs in the family Oxycarenidae. There are at least three described species in Mayana.

Species
These three species belong to the genus Mayana:
 Mayana costatus Distant, W.L., 1893 c g
 Mayana diruptus Distant, W.L., 1882 c g
 Mayana ramosus Barber, H.G., 1938 c g
Data sources: i = ITIS, c = Catalogue of Life, g = GBIF, b = Bugguide.net

References

Further reading

External links

 

Lygaeoidea